So-Young Pi (born 1946) is a South Korean physicist.

So-Young Pi's father was the Korean writer Pi Chun-deuk. She attended Seoul National University, graduating with a degree in physics, before moving to the United States to pursue a doctorate in the subject at the State University of New York at Stony Brook. Pi then completed postdoctoral research at Rockefeller University and the Massachusetts Institute of Technology. During her postdoctoral research, Pi met and later married fellow physicist Roman Jackiw. The two had a son, violinist Stefan Jackiw.

Pi taught at Boston University and was granted emeritus status upon retirement. In 2014, she was elected a fellow of the American Physical Society, which recognized her "[f]or her seminal contributions to the phenomenon of density fluctuations in theories of cosmic inflation."

References

Living people
1946 births
South Korean expatriates in the United States
South Korean women scientists
South Korean physicists
Stony Brook University alumni
Seoul National University alumni
Hongcheon Pi clan
Fellows of the American Physical Society